Sanjay Mayukh is an Indian politician from Bharatiya Janata Party. Mayukh was elected unopposed to the Bihar Legislative Council on June 29, 2020. He is also the Bharatiya Janata Party National Spokesperson and Media Co-head in charge along with Anil Baluni.

References

Living people
Date of birth missing (living people)
Bharatiya Janata Party politicians from Bihar
Members of the Bihar Legislative Council
Place of birth missing (living people)
Year of birth missing (living people)
People from Patna